A fret is a raised portion on the neck of a stringed instrument.

Fret or FRET may also refer to:

 Förster resonance energy transfer or fluorescence resonance energy transfer; a fluorescence phenomenon with applications in biology and chemistry 
 Fret (architecture), a repeated geometric ornament, forming a frieze
 Fret (heraldry), a heraldic charge
 FRET (magazine), a free magazine about the pop music scene in the Netherlands
 SNCF Fret, the rail freight organisation of the SNCF
 worry, as in to fret about something
 Sea fret or haar, a cold sea fog

See also
 Fretter, an American electronics retailer
 Fretting, wear and corrosion damage at the asperities of contact surfaces